Basin Street Records is a Grammy Award-winning independent record label based in New Orleans, Louisiana, that specializes in jazz, funk, and rhythm and blues (R&B).

Basin Street Records was founded in 1997 by Mark Samuels and Tom Thompson. The label arose out of an agreement to release a live album for New Orleans jazz trumpeter and vocalist Kermit Ruffins, who was managed by Thompson. In mid-1998 Samuels bought  Thompson's interest in the company.

In 2005, Hurricane Katrina flooded the Basin Street Records office and Mark Samuels's home. Samuels continued to operate the company from "computers in coffee shops" while rebuilding his home and office in New Orleans.

Basin Street concentrates on jazz, funk, blues, and rhythm and blues. The roster includes Kermit Ruffins, Los Hombres Calientes, Jason Marsalis, Irvin Mayfield, Michael White, The Headhunters, Henry Butler, Jon Cleary, Theresa Andersson, Jeremy Davenport, Rebirth Brass Band, and Davell Crawford.

Awards
 Best Latin Jazz Album, Los Hombres Calientes, Billboard Latin Music Awards (1998)
 Best Record Label, OffBeat magazine, 2000, 2002–2005, 2009, 2012–2015
 Music Business of the Year, OffBeat magazine, 2003, 2004, 2013
 Grammy Award for Best Regional Roots Music Album, Rebirth of New Orleans, Rebirth Brass Band (2012)

References

External links
 Official site

American independent record labels
Jazz record labels
Record labels based in Louisiana